Alan Hobkirk (born November 7, 1952) is a former field hockey player from Canada, who participated at the 1976 Summer Olympics in Montreal. There the striker finished tenth with the Men's National Team. Hobkirk participated in four Pan American Games between 1971 and 1983, winning a full collection of medals: one golden (1983 in Caracas), two silver (1975 in Mexico, 1979 in San Juan) and one bronze (1971 in Cali).

References

External links
 
UBC Hall of Fame profile

1952 births
Living people
Canadian male field hockey players
Canadian Rhodes Scholars
Field hockey players at the 1976 Summer Olympics
Olympic field hockey players of Canada
Canadian people of Scottish descent
Pan American Games medalists in field hockey
Pan American Games gold medalists for Canada
Pan American Games silver medalists for Canada
Pan American Games bronze medalists for Canada
Field hockey players at the 1971 Pan American Games
Field hockey players at the 1975 Pan American Games
Field hockey players at the 1979 Pan American Games
Field hockey players at the 1983 Pan American Games
Medalists at the 1971 Pan American Games
Medalists at the 1975 Pan American Games
Medalists at the 1979 Pan American Games
Medalists at the 1983 Pan American Games